Touro Synagogue Cemetery (also known as the Jewish Cemetery at Newport), dedicated in 1677, is located in the colonial historic district of Newport, Rhode Island, not far from the Touro Synagogue. Other Jewish graves are found nearby as part of the Common Burying Ground and Island Cemetery on Farewell Street.

The gated Touro Cemetery is at present opened to the public only once per year.

History
The cemetery was founded in 1677 or possibly earlier. In the Newport land records, a deed was recorded on 28 Feb 1677 for a certain parcel of land, 30 feet square, sold by Nathaniel Dickens to Mordecai Campannall and Moses Packechoe for a burial-place for the Jews of Newport, and this purchase may have been an addition to a cemetery that was already in existence as of that date.

The synagogue is the oldest surviving synagogue building in the United States, and the cemetery is the second oldest Jewish cemetery in the country. The cemetery gates are  decorated with torches turned to face downward, an acknowledgement of the ending of life's flame.  Prior to the establishment of Temple Ohabei Shalom Cemetery in Boston in 1844, Jews from Massachusetts were sent to the Touro Synagogue Cemetery, the West Indies, or Europe for burial in sacred ground.

Judah Touro, a philanthropist who was born and reared in Newport, contributed $40,000, an immense sum at the time, to the Jewish cemetery at Newport.  This funded the restoration and maintenance of the cemetery.  He is buried in the Jewish cemetery of Newport. The inscription on his tombstone reads: "To the Memory of / Judah Touro / He inscribed it in the Book of / Philanthropy / To be remembered forever."

The cemetery's Egyptian revival gate and fence were designed by Boston architect Isaiah Rogers (1810–49) who designed  an identical gate for Boston's Old Granary Burying Ground.

By the mid-19th century, the maritime prosperity that built Newport's fine colonial churches, synagogue, public buildings and homes had vanished when the port of Providence superseded Newport after the British destroyed Newport's wharves during the American Revolution. The great mansions of Newport in the Gilded Age were still in the future. Newport in the 1850s was an old seaport town whose air of genteel decay and cool sea breezes had recently begun to attract members of Boston's intellectual elite as a summer retreat. There were virtually no Jews in Newport in this period; the synagogue was shuttered.

American writer Henry Wadsworth Longfellow visited the area in July 1852 and showed an interest more in the cemetery than in the synagogue, which he described as being "a shady nook, at the corner of two dusty, frequented streets". Longfellow was inspired to write his poem
"The Jewish Cemetery at Newport" during this visit.  Longfellow, a scholar who knew Hebrew, begins his poem by expressing his surprise at coming upon a synagogue in an old New England port town, due to the dearth of Jews in New England during that time and the Colonial era.

The American Jewish poet Emma Lazarus wrote a sort of redux of Longfellow's poem in 1867 titled, "In
the Jewish Synagogue at Newport". Some interpreters contend that Lazarus intended with her poem to let Longfellow know that the Jews might be down, but that they were not dead. However, this interpretation matches neither the mournful tone nor the explicit references to the defunct nature of the Newport synagogue, such as "no signs of life", and the general reference to Hebrew as "a language dead", not to mention the concluding line referring to "the mystery of death". In this latter interpretation, Lazarus was concurring with Longfellow regarding the sanctity of Jewish memory while acknowledging the unlikelihood of a Jewish national revival, which really only blossomed in the decade following the deaths of Longfellow and Lazarus.

Notable burials
 Judah Touro, philanthropist
 Aaron Lopez, Portuguese Jewish merchant and philanthropist

Gallery

See also

 Touro Synagogue
 Judah Touro
 List of cemeteries in Rhode Island

Notes

External links

 Touro Cemetery
 

1677 establishments in Rhode Island
Buildings and structures in Newport, Rhode Island
Cemeteries in Rhode Island
Jewish cemeteries in Rhode Island
Protected areas of Newport County, Rhode Island
Tourist attractions in Newport, Rhode Island